Alliance Ground Surveillance (AGS) is a NATO programme to acquire an airborne ground surveillance capability (Multi-Platform Radar Technology Insertion Program on the Northrop Grumman RQ-4 Global Hawk).

In a similar fashion as with Strategic Airlift Capability the program is run by 15 NATO member states: Bulgaria, Czech Republic, Denmark, Estonia, Germany, Italy, Latvia, Lithuania, Luxembourg, Norway, Poland, Romania, Slovakia, Slovenia and the United States and soon to be the United Kingdom. The AGS system comprises five NATO RQ-4D Phoenix remotely piloted aircraft and the associated European-sourced ground command and control stations. 

AGS was scheduled to reach initial operational capability by the end of 2017 with a main operating base at Sigonella Air Base, Italy.

First Global Hawk Block 40 UAVs destined for the NATO AGS program rolled off Northrop Grumman production line in Palmdale Ca on 4 June 2015.  One arrived at Edwards Air Force Base on December 19, 2015 completing its first flight and the rest stayed in plant 42 located in Palmdale, CA

In July 2017, the USAF assigned the Mission Designation Series (MDS) of RQ-4D to the NATO AGS air vehicle.

The first RQ-4D aircraft arrived at Sigonella Air Base (NAS2) on November 21, 2019. At that time, all five aircraft were undergoing developmental test flights. Initial operational capability (IOC) was expected in the first half of 2020.

The last RQ-4D aircraft arrived on November 12, 2020. Initial operational capability was achieved in February 2021.

See also
Unmanned aerial vehicle
12th Reconnaissance Squadron
348th Reconnaissance Squadron

References

External links
NATO Alliance Ground Surveillance

Radar
NATO